The Southwest Grassfields, traditionally called Western Momo when considered part of the Momo group or when Momo is included in Grassfields, are a small branch of the Southern Bantoid languages spoken in the Western grassfields of Cameroon.

The languages are Manta (Tanka, Batakpa), Balo (Alunfa), Osatu, Busam, Menka–Atoŋ.

Several of these have been classified as Tivoid, a position reflected in Ethnologue.

Classification
Blench (2010) recognises five coordinate subgroups within Southwest Grassfields.
Southwest Grassfields
Busam
Menka, Atong
Tanka, Bantakpa, Manta
Osatu
Alunfa, Balo

Footnotes

References
Blench, Roger (2010) Classification of Momo and West Momo
Roger Blench (2010) The Tivoid Languages

 
Grassfields Bantu languages
Languages of Cameroon